The short-clawed lark (Certhilauda chuana) or short-clawed bush-lark, is a species of lark in the family Alaudidae. It is found in Botswana and South Africa. Its natural habitat is dry savannah.

Taxonomy and systematics 
Originally, the short-clawed lark was classified as belonging to the genus Alauda and then Mirafra until moved to Calendulauda. Not all authorities recognize this re-classification from Mirafra.

Behaviour and ecology

The species lays clutches of two or three eggs (average clutch sizes in two studies 2.27-2.75 eggs). The incubation lasts for around 15 days, the longest of any African lark species. After fledging, chicks remain with their parents for 6–8 weeks. There is some variation in nesting strategies in the species, with the eastern population (in South Africa) having numerous broods per breeding season and the western population (in Botswana) breeding once per season.

Gallery

References

 Engelbrecht, Derek (2005)  "Breeding biology of the eastern population of the Short-clawed Lark in South Africa" Ostrich - Journal of African Ornithology, 76 (3-4_ 154-161

External links

 Species text - The Atlas of Southern African Birds

short-clawed lark
short-clawed lark
Taxonomy articles created by Polbot